John Frederick "Jack" Williams (18 November 188228 August 1911) was a Welsh international rugby union lock who played club rugby for London Welsh. He won four caps for Wales between 1905 and 1906 and most notably was a member of the winning Welsh team in the famous Match of the Century against the original All Blacks.

International career

Of all the Welsh players who played in the 1905 Match of the Century "Champions of the World" team, Williams is the most enigmatic. Over his career he achieved by far the lowest number of international caps out of the 1905 team and played the majority of his career outside Wales. It was said that Williams was a good kicker of the ball and "could pick up like a half, pass like a centre and run like a wing". During his club career with London Welsh he captained the club during the 1907/08 season.

Williams began playing rugby while in school at Christ College, Brecon. After moving to London, he joined Welsh exile club London Welsh, also turning out for English side Richmond. Williams made his international debut against Ireland on 11 March 1905 while playing for London Welsh. He was chosen for the 1905 All Blacks game and he proved an excellent choice working well with Harding and Hodges to back up Dai Jones in the pack and line out. Williams short international career ended in the disastrous 1906 South African game, where dissent surrounding the pack resulted in a Welsh team without cohesion. The selectors decided a 'clean sweep' was required and very few of that team, including Williams, played for Wales again.

In 1908 Williams was chosen to join Harding's Anglo-Welsh team who toured Australia and New Zealand.

International matches played
Wales
  Ireland 1905
  New Zealand 1905
  Scotland 1906
  South Africa 1906

British Isles
  New Zealand 1908

Later career and death
In 1910, Williams was sent to Northern Nigeria, by the Colonial Office to work in the capacity of a commissioner. It was recorded in The Sportsman that shortly after assuming his post, Williams was shot by a local. The paper went on to state that Williams had recovered from the bullet wound, and that the shooting had been an accident. Williams died the next year, at the age of 28, after contracting blackwater fever in Nigeria while on Colonial Service.

Bibliography

References

1882 births
1911 deaths
Barbarian F.C. players
British & Irish Lions rugby union players from Wales
British expatriates in Nigeria
British shooting survivors
Deaths from malaria
Glamorgan County RFC players
Infectious disease deaths in Nigeria
London Welsh RFC players
People educated at Christ College, Brecon
People from colonial Nigeria
Richmond F.C. players
Rugby union locks
Rugby union players from Brecon
Wales international rugby union players
Welsh rugby union players